Mark Schwed (September 24, 1955 – January, 31 2008) was an American television critic, journalist and actor. He worked for The Palm Beach Post for 11 years and also as a critic for the Los Angeles Herald Examiner. Associate editor of The Palm Beach Post Jan Tuckwood said Schwed "Had a great instinct for what we call the quick-turn human-interest story".

Schwed died on January 31, 2008, of undisclosed causes. Schwed appeared fine until the beginning of the week when he called in work ill.

References

American television critics
American male journalists
20th-century American journalists
1956 births
2008 deaths